The Gift to Stalin is a 2008 joint Kazakhstani/Russian/Polish/Israeli film by Kazakhfilm that tells the story of a little Jewish boy named Sasha who is sent to Kazakhstan. He is saved from death by an old Kazakh man, Kasym, who takes the boy into his home. The film is set in 1949 and is based on the memoirs of Russian Jewish writer David Markish, also portrayed in his trilogy A New World for Simon Ashkenazy.
 
The title, The Gift to Stalin, has two meanings. The first one Sasha’s dream He hopes that if he gives Stalin a gift, he will be able to see his parents again, not knowing that they have been killed. The second context is that in 1949 the Soviet government carried out a nuclear test (RDS-1)  on Joseph Stalin’s 70th anniversary.  When Sasha visited his Kazakh aul many years later, he found it destroyed by the nuclear explosion.

Awards
2009: Grand Prix at the Busan International Film Festival
2009:Three awards at the Warsaw Jewish Film Festival, Grand Prix, the best full feature, and best actor (Dalen Shintemirov)

Notes

References

External links
 

2000s Russian-language films
2008 films
2008 drama films
Films about Jews and Judaism
Films set in 1949
Films about Joseph Stalin